The Valley of Hinnom is a historic valley surrounding Ancient Jerusalem from the west and southwest. The valley is also known by the name Gehinnom ( Gēʾ-Hīnnōm, lit. 'Valley of Hinnom') an alternative Biblical Hebrew form which survived into Aramaic and has received various fundamental theological connotations, and by the Greek and Syriac transliteration Gehenna (Γέεννα Géenna/ܓܼܼܗܲܢܵܐ Gihanna).

The Valley of Hinnom is first mentioned in the Hebrew Bible as part of the border between the tribes of Judah and Benjamin (Joshua 15:8). During the late First Temple period, it was the site of the Tophet, where some of the kings of Judah had sacrificed their children by fire (Jeremiah 7:31). Thereafter, it was cursed by the biblical prophet Jeremiah (Jeremiah 19:2–6). In later Jewish rabbinic literature, Gehinnom became associated with divine punishment in Jewish Apocalypticism as the destination of the wicked. It is different from the more neutral term Sheol, the abode of the dead. The King James Version of the Bible translates both with the Anglo-Saxon word hell.

The Valley of Hinnom is the Modern Hebrew name for the valley surrounding the Old City of Jerusalem and the adjacent Mount Zion from the west and south. It meets and merges with the Kidron Valley, the other principal valley around the Old City, near the Pool of Siloam which lie to the southeastern corner of Ancient Jerusalem. It is also known as Wadi er-Rababi ( "valley of the Rebab"). The northwestern part of the valley is now an urban park.

In Judaism, the term Gehinnom is used for the realm in which the wicked expiate their sins.

Etymology
The Bible refers to the valley as  Gei Ben-Hinnom, literally the "valley of the son of Hinnom" or גֵי־הִנֹּם Gē Hīnnōm, "valley of Hinnom". In Mishnaic Hebrew and Aramaic, the name was contracted into  Gehinnom or  Gehinnam.

English "Gehenna" represents Géenna (from ), the Greek transliteration found in the New Testament.

Geography

The exact location of the Valley of Hinnom is disputed. George Adam Smith wrote in 1907 that there are three possible locations considered by historical writers:
 East of the Old City (today identified as the Valley of Josaphat)
 Within the Old City (today identified as the Tyropoeon Valley): Many commentaries give the location as below the southern wall of ancient Jerusalem, stretching from the foot of Mount Zion eastward past the Tyropoeon to the Kidron Valley. However the Tyropoeon Valley is usually no longer associated with the Valley of Hinnom because during the period of Ahaz and Manasseh, the Tyropoeon lay within the city walls and child sacrifice would have been practiced outside the walls of the city.
 Wadi ar-Rababi: Dalman (1930), Bailey (1986) and Watson (1992) identify the Wadi ar-Rababi, which fits the description of Joshua that Hinnom valley ran east to west and lay outside the city walls. According to Joshua, the valley began at En-rogel. If the modern Bir Ayyub is En-rogel, then Wadi ar-Rababi, which begins there, is Hinnom.

Archaeology

Child sacrifice at other Tophets contemporary with the Bible accounts (700–600 BC) of the reigns of Ahaz and Manasseh have been established, such as the bones of children sacrificed at the Tophet to the goddess Tanit in Phoenician Carthage, and also child sacrifice in ancient Syria-Palestine. Scholars such as Mosca (1975) have concluded that the sacrifice recorded in the Hebrew Bible, such as Jeremiah's comment that the worshippers of Baal had "filled this place with the blood of innocents", is literal. Yet, the biblical words in the Book of Jeremiah describe events taking place in the seventh century in the place of Ben-hinnom: "Because they [the Israelites] have forsaken Me and have made this an alien place and have burned sacrifices in it to other gods, that neither they nor their forefathers nor the kings of Judah had ever known, and because they have filled this place with the blood of the innocent and have built the high places of Baal to burn their sons in the fire as burnt offerings to Baal, a thing which I never commanded or spoke of, nor did it ever enter My mind; therefore, behold, days are coming," declares the LORD, "when this place will no longer be called Topheth or the valley of Ben-hinnom, but rather the valley of Slaughter". J. Day, Heider, and Mosca believe that the Moloch cult took place in the valley of Hinnom at the Topheth.

No archaeological evidence such as mass children's graves has been found; however, it has been suggested that such a find may be compromised by the heavy population history of the Jerusalem area compared to the Tophet found in Tunisia. The site would also have been disrupted by the actions of Josiah "And he defiled Topheth, which is in the valley of the children of Hinnom, that no man might make his son or his daughter to pass through the fire to Molech." (2 Kings 23). A minority of scholars have attempted to argue that the Bible does not portray actual child sacrifice, but only dedication to the god by fire; however, they are judged to have been "convincingly disproved" (Hay, 2011).

The concept of Gehinnom

Hebrew Bible
The oldest historical reference to the valley is found in Joshua 15:8,  which describe tribal boundaries. Since Hezekiah, his legitimate son by the daughter of the High Priest, succeeded him as king, this, if literal, is assumed to mean children by unrecorded pagan wives or concubines. Debate remains as to whether the phrase "cause his children to pass through the fire" referred to a religious ceremony in which the Moloch priest would walk the child between two lanes of fire, or to literal child sacrifice wherein the child is thrown into the fire.

The Book of Isaiah does not mention Gehenna by name, but the "burning place"  in which the Assyrian army is to be destroyed, may be read "Topheth", and the final verse of Isaiah which concerns of those that have rebelled against God, .

In the reign of Josiah a call came from Jeremiah to destroy the shrines in Topheth and to end the practice , . Despite Josiah's ending of the practice, Jeremiah also included a prophecy that Jerusalem itself would be made like Gehenna and Topheth.

Frequent references to 'Gehenna' are also made in the books of Meqabyan, which are considered canonical in the Ethiopian Orthodox Tewahedo Church.

Targums

The ancient Aramaic paraphrase-translations of the Hebrew Bible known as Targums supply the term "Gehinnom" frequently to verses touching upon resurrection, judgment, and the fate of the wicked. This may also include addition of the phrase "second death", as in the final chapter of the Book of Isaiah, where the Hebrew version does not mention either Gehinnom or the Second Death, whereas the Targums add both. In this the Targums are parallel to the Gospel of Mark addition of "Gehenna" to the quotation of the Isaiah verses describing the corpses "where their worm does not die".

Rabbinical Judaism (with apocryphal/pseudo religious texts)
The rabbis use only the term "Gehinnom", which derives directly from the Hebrew, and never "Gehenna," which is the Greek transliteration. Gehenna is not mentioned in the Torah in the sense of "hell". Nevertheless, some rabbinic texts maintain that God created Gehenna on the second day of Creation (Genesis Rabbah 4:6, 11:9). Other texts claim that Gehenna was part of God's original plan for the universe and was actually created before the Earth (Pesahim 54a; Sifre Deuteronomy 37). The concept of Gehenna was likely inspired by the biblical notion of Sheol. The original picture of [Sheol] is not the first century "Eternal Lake of Fire" Gehenna as the place of punishment or destruction of the wicked and does not occur frequently in classic rabbinic sources. Gehenna is likened to [Sheol] where the wicked go to suffer when they are judged. The Mishnah names seven Biblical individuals who do not get a share in Olam Ha-Ba: Jeroboam, Ahab, Menasseh, Doeg the Edomite, Ahitophel, Balaam, and Gehazi. According to the opinion of Rabbi Yehuda, Menasseh got a share in Olam Ha-Ba Midrash Konen places Ahab in the fifth department of Gehenna, as having the heathen under his charge. Absalom was consigned to the 7th circle of Gehenna, and according to the description of Gehenna by Joshua ben Levi, who, like Dante, wandered through hell under the guidance of the angel Duma, Absalom still dwells there, having the rebellious heathen in charge; and when the angels with their fiery rods run also against Absalom to smite him like the rest, a heavenly voice says: "Spare Absalom, the son of David, My servant." His half brother Amnon was said to be possibly consigned to the 2nd circle of Gehenna. Amon of Judah sinned very much but his name was not placed on the list of the kings excluded from the world to come out of respect for his son Josiah; however a midrashic fragment reads: "No sin is more grievous than idolatry, for it is treason against God. Yet even this has been forgiven upon sincere repentance; but he that sins from a mere spirit of opposition, to see whether God will punish the wicked, shall find no pardon, although he say in his heart, 'I shall have peace in the end (by repenting), though I walk in the stubbornness of my evil heart'" (Deut. xxix. 19). Such a one was Amon, the son of Manasseh, for the (Apocryphal) Scripture says: "And Amon reasoned an evil reasoning of transgression and said: 'My father from his childhood was a great transgressor, and he repented in his old age. So will I now walk after the lust of my soul and afterward return to the Lord.' And he committed more evil in the sight of the Lord than all that were before him; but the Lord God speedily cut him off from this good land. And his servants conspired against him and slew him in his own house, and he reigned two years only." It is noteworthy that this very midrashic fragment casts light upon the emphatic teaching of the Mishnah (Yoma, viii. 9): "Whosoever says, 'I will sin and repent thereafter,' will not be granted the time for repentance." In the Aggadah. Jehoiakim is still undergoing punishment for his sins. Although the Babylonian Talmud does not include him among those who have no place in the world to come (cf. Sanh. 103b), the Palestinian Talmud cites him as an example of one who has forfeited his place in heaven by publicly transgressing the law. A Judge of Israel Jair for forcing men to prostrate themselves before an altar of Baal was punished with kareth by the L-D: "Hear the words of the Lord ere thou diest. I appointed thee as prince over my people, and thou didst break My covenant, seduce My people, and seek to burn My servants with fire, but they were animated and freed by the living, the heavenly fire. As for thee, thou wilt die, and die by fire,a fire in which thou wilt abide forever." Thereupon the angel burnt him with a thousand men, whom he had taken in the act of paying homage to Baal. " The worst part of Gehenna is called Tzoah Rotachat. Achan is held up by the rabbis as a model of the penitent sinner; because his public confession and subsequent punishment saved him from eternal doom in Gehenna. "Every culprit before he is to meet his penalty of death," says the Mishnah Sanh. vi. 2, "is told to make a public confession, in order to be saved from Gehenna's doom." Thus Achan confessed to all his sins when he said: "Of a truth I have sinned against the Lord, the God of Israel, and thus and thus I have done." That his avowal saved him from eternal doom may be learned from Joshua's words to Achan: "Why hast thou troubled us? So may the Lord trouble you this day," which are taken to mean "in the life that now is, so that thou mayest be released in the life to come" (Sanh. 43b-44; see also Ḳimḥi on Josh. v. 25).'

The specific rabbinical term for heresies, or religious divisions due to an unlawful spirit, is minim (lit. "kinds [of belief]"; the singular min, for "heretic" or "Gnostic," is coined idiomatically, like goy and am ha'aretz; see Gnosticism). The law "You shall not cut yourselves" (לא תתגדדו) is interpreted by the rabbis: "You shall not form divisions [לא תעשו אגודות אגודות], but shall form one bond" (after , A. V. "troop"). Besides the term min (מין) for "heretic," the Talmud uses the words ḥitzonim (outsiders), apikoros, and kofer ba-Torah, or kofer ba-ikkar (he who denies the fundamentals of faith); also poresh mi-darke tzibbur (he who deviates from the customs of the community). It is said that all these groups are consigned to Gehinnom for all eternity and have no possibility of a portion in the world to come.

He maintained that in this loathsome valley fires were kept burning perpetually to consume the filth and cadavers thrown into it. However, Hermann Strack and Paul Billerbeck state that there is neither archaeological nor literary evidence in support of this claim, in either the earlier intertestamental or the later rabbinic sources. Also, Lloyd R. Bailey's "Gehenna: The Topography of Hell" from 1986 holds a similar view.

There is evidence however that the southwest shoulder of this valley (Ketef Hinnom) was a burial location with numerous burial chambers that were reused by generations of families from as early as the seventh until the fifth century BCE. The use of this area for tombs continued into the first centuries BCE and CE. By 70 CE, the area was not only a burial site but also a place for cremation of the dead with the arrival of the Tenth Roman Legion, who were the only group known to practice cremation in this region.

In time it became deemed to be accursed and an image of the place of destruction in Jewish folklore.

Eventually the Hebrew term Gehinnom became a figurative name for the place of spiritual purification for the wicked dead in Judaism. According to most Jewish sources, the period of purification or punishment is limited to only 12 months and every Sabbath day is excluded from punishment, while the fires of Gehinnom are banked and its tortures are suspended. For the duration of Shabbat, the spirits who are serving time there are released to roam the earth. At Motza'ei Shabbat, the angel Dumah, who has charge over the souls of the wicked, herds them back for another week of torment. After this the soul will move on to Olam Ha-Ba (the world to come), be destroyed, or continue to exist in a state of consciousness of remorse. Gehenna became a metonym for "Hell" due to its morbid prominence in Jewish religious texts.

Maimonides declares, in his 13 principles of faith, that the descriptions of Gehenna, as a place of punishment in rabbinic literature, were pedagogically motivated inventions to encourage respect of the Torah commandments by mankind, which had been regarded as immature. Instead of being sent to Gehenna, the souls of the wicked would actually get annihilated.

Christianity (New Testament)
In the King James Version of the Bible, the term appears 13 times in 11 different verses as Valley of Hinnom, Valley of the son of Hinnom or Valley of the children of Hinnom.

In the synoptic Gospels the various authors describe Jesus, who was Jewish, as using the word Gehenna to describe the opposite to life in the Kingdom. The term is used 11 times in these writings. In certain usage, the Christian Bible refers to it as a place where both soul (Greek: ψυχή, psyche) and body could be destroyed in "unquenchable fire".

Christian usage of Gehenna often serves to admonish adherents of the religion to live pious lives. Examples of Gehenna in the Christian New Testament include:
 Matthew 5:22: "....whoever shall say, 'You fool', shall be guilty enough to go into Gehenna."
 Matthew 5:29: "....it is better for you that one of the parts of your body perish, than for your whole body to be thrown into Gehenna."
 Matthew 5:30: "....better for you that one of the parts of your body perish, than for your whole body to go into Gehenna."
 Matthew 10:28: "....rather fear Him who is able to destroy both soul [Greek: ψυχή] and body in Gehenna."
 Matthew 18:9: "It is better for you to enter life with one eye, than with two eyes to be thrown into the Gehenna...."
 Matthew 23:15: "Woe to you, scribes and Pharisees, hypocrites, because you... make one proselyte...twice as much a child of Gehenna as yourselves."
 Matthew 23:33, to the Pharisees: "You serpents, you brood of vipers, how shall you escape the sentence of Gehenna?"
 Mark 9:43: "It is better for you to enter life crippled, than having your two hands, to go into Gehenna into the unquenchable fire."
 Mark 9:45: "It is better for you to enter life lame, than having your two feet, to be cast into Gehenna."
 Mark 9:47: "It is better for you to enter the Kingdom of God with one eye, than having two eyes, to be cast into Gehenna."
 Luke 12:5: "....fear the One who, after He has killed has authority to cast into Gehenna; yes, I tell you, fear Him."

Another book to use the word Gehenna in the New Testament is James:
 James 3:6: "And the tongue is a fire,...and sets on fire the course of our life, and is set on fire by Gehenna."

Translations in Christian Bibles
The New Testament also refers to Hades as a place distinct from Gehenna. Unlike Gehenna, Hades typically conveys neither fire nor punishment but forgetfulness. The Book of Revelation describes Hades being cast into the lake of fire. The King James Version is the only English translation in modern use to translate Sheol, Hades, Tartarus (Greek ταρταρώσας; lemma: ταρταρόω tartaroō), and Gehenna as Hell. In the New Testament, the New International Version, New Living Translation, New American Standard Bible (among others) all reserve the term "hell" for the translation of Gehenna or Tartarus (see above), transliterating Hades as a term directly from the equivalent Greek term.

Treatment of Gehenna in Christianity is significantly affected by whether the distinction in Hebrew and Greek between Gehenna and Hades was maintained:

Translations with a distinction:
 The fourth century Ulfilas (Wulfila) or Gothic Bible is the first Bible to use Hell's Proto-Germanic form Halja, and maintains a distinction between Hades and Gehenna. However, unlike later translations, Halja (Matt 11:23) is reserved for Hades, and Gehenna is transliterated to Gaiainnan (Matt 5:30), which surprisingly is the opposite to modern translations that translate Gehenna into Hell and leave Hades untranslated (see below).
 The late fourth century Latin Vulgate transliterates the Greek Γέεννα "gehenna" with "gehennæ" (e.g. Matt 5:22) while using "infernus" ("coming from below, of the underworld") to translate ᾅδης (Hades]).
 The 19th century Young's Literal Translation tries to be as literal a translation as possible and does not use the word Hell at all, keeping the words Hades and Gehenna untranslated.
 The 19th century Arabic Van Dyck distinguishes Gehenna from Sheol.
 The 20th century New International Version, New Living Translation and New American Standard Bible reserve the term "Hell" only for when Gehenna or Tartarus is used. All translate Sheol and Hades in a different fashion. For a time the exception to this was the 1984 edition of the New International Version's translation in Luke 16:23, which was its singular rendering of Hades as Hell. The 2011 edition renders it as Hades.
 In texts in Greek, and consistently in the Eastern Orthodox Church, the distinctions present in the originals were often maintained. The Russian Synodal Bible (and one translation by the Old Church Slavonic) also maintain the distinction. In modern Russian, the concept of Hell (Ад) is directly derived from Hades (Аид), separate and independent of Gehenna. Fire imagery is attributed primarily to Gehenna, which is most commonly mentioned as Gehenna the Fiery (Геенна огненная), and appears to be synonymous to the lake of fire.
 The New World Translation, used by Jehovah's Witnesses, maintains a distinction between Gehenna and Hades by transliterating Gehenna, and by rendering "Hades" (or "Sheol") as "the Grave". Earlier editions left all three names untranslated.
 The word "hell" is not used in the New American Bible, except in a footnote in the book of Job translating an alternative passage from the Vulgate, in which the word corresponds to Jerome's "inferos," itself a translation of "sheol." "Gehenna" is untranslated, "Hades" either untranslated or rendered "netherworld," and "sheol" rendered "nether world."

Translations without a distinction:
 The late tenth century Wessex Gospels and the 14th century Wycliffe Bible render both the Latin inferno and gehenna as Hell.
 The 16th century Tyndale and later translators had access to the Greek, but Tyndale translated both Gehenna and Hades as same English word, Hell.
 The 17th century King James Version of the Bible is the only English translation in modern use to translate Sheol, Hades, and Gehenna by calling them all "Hell."

Many modern Christians consider Gehenna to be a place of eternal punishment.  Annihilationist Christians, however, imagine Gehenna to be a place where sinners are tormented until they are eventually destroyed, soul and all. Some Christian scholars, however, have suggested that Gehenna may not be synonymous with the lake of fire, but a prophetic metaphor for the horrible fate that awaited the many civilians killed in the destruction of Jerusalem in 70 CE.

Islam
The name given to Hell in Islam, Jahannam, directly derives from Gehenna. The Quran contains 77 references to the Islamic interpretation of Gehenna (جهنم), but does not mention Sheol / Hades (abode of the dead), and instead uses the word "Qabr" (قبر, meaning grave). In Muslim tradition, graves are considered gates to the otherworld, both paradise and hell. Muslim authors proposed that Hell co-exist with the contemporary world somewhere underground, and tried to locate an entrance to hell, and proposed that one of its gates lies in the Valley of Hinnom.

Jahannam itself is only the name of the upper most layer of hell, preserved for Muslim sinners. Even those who uphold the eternity of hell believe that Jahannam will be eventually destroyed.

See also
 Araf (Islam)
 Christian views on Hell
 Heaven in Judaism
 Heaven in Christianity
 Jahannam, the realm of punishment for the evil in Islam
 Jannah, the final abode of the righteous in Islam
 Jewish eschatology
 Hell in the arts and popular culture
 Gehenna (disambiguation)
 Gehenna (comics)
 Gehenna (Dungeons & Dragons) game
 Gehenna (World of Darkness) game
 Matarta
 Outer darkness, New Testament term
 Spirit world (Latter Day Saints)
 Spirits in prison, New Testament term
 Tzoah Rotachat, location in Gehenna (Gehinnom) where the souls of Jews who committed certain sins are sent for punishment
 World of Darkness (Mandaeism)
 World of Light

References

External links 

 Short guide to today's Valley of Hinnom, with biblical story
 Columbia Encyclopedia on the Valley of Hinnom
 Biblical Proper Names on the Valley of Hinnom
 Gehenna from the 1901–1906 Jewish Encyclopedia
 The Jewish view of Hell on chabad.org
 Olam Ha-Ba: The Afterlife Judaism 101
 What Is Gehenna? Ariela Pelaia, About religion, about.com
 What is Gehenna Like?: Rabbinic Descriptions of Gehenna Ariela Pelaia, About religion, about.com
 A Christian Universalist perspective from Tentmaker.org
 A Christian Conditionalist perspective on Gehenna from Afterlife.co.nz

 
Christian cosmology
Christian eschatology
Geography of Jerusalem
Hebrew Bible valleys
Hell (Christianity)
Islamic eschatology
Jahannam
Jewish eschatology
Jewish underworld
Religious cosmologies
Afterlife places
Valleys of Israel
Book of Jeremiah